Lisa Tomaschewsky (born 22 July 1988) is a German film and television actress.
She was the German Playboy Playmate of the Month for February 2009.

Filmography 
 2011: Verbotene Liebe
 2011: Hut in the Woods
 2013: Küstenwache – (Episode: Miss Ostsee)
 2013: Polizeiruf 110 – (Episode:Laufsteg in den Tod)
 2013: The Girl with Nine Wigs (Heute bin ich blond)
 2014: Audrey
 2014: Frühlingsgeflüster
 2014: Leipzig Homicide
 2015: Alles Verbrecher – (Episode:Leiche im Keller)
 2015: Die Wallensteins
 2015: Deutschland 83
 2016: Verrückt nach Fixi

Trivia 
 She shaved her head for a role in the movie Heute bin ich blond.
 She took part in video clip in the Robin Schulz song, "OK" .

External links

German television actresses
1988 births
Living people
People from Itzehoe
21st-century German actresses
2000s Playboy Playmates